Vesiculariidae is a family of bryozoans belonging to the order Ctenostomatida.

Genera:
 Amathia Lamouroux, 1812
 Avenella Dalyell, 1847
 Crassicaula Baranova, 1992
 Vesicularia Thompson, 1830
 Watersiana Calvet, 1912

References

Bryozoan families